Sommaia is a genus of beetles in the family Buprestidae, containing the following species:

 Sommaia gibber Toyama, 1985
 Sommaia kalabi Volkovitsh, 2008

References

Buprestidae genera